German submarine U-258 was a Type VIIC U-boat of Nazi Germany's Kriegsmarine during World War II. She was laid down at the Bremer Vulkan yard at Bremen-Vegesack on 20 March 1941 as yard number 23. She was launched on 13 December and commissioned on 4 February 1942.

U-258 was sunk by a Royal Air Force Consolidated B-24 Liberator bomber of 120 Squadron in the North Atlantic on 20 May 1943.

Design
German Type VIIC submarines were preceded by the shorter Type VIIB submarines. U-258 had a displacement of  when at the surface and  while submerged. She had two shafts and two  propellers.

U-258 was fitted with five  torpedo tubes (four fitted at the bow and one at the stern), fourteen torpedoes, one  SK C/35 naval gun, 220 rounds, and two twin  C/30 anti-aircraft guns. The boat had a complement of between forty-four and sixty.

Wolfpacks
U-258 took part in eleven wolfpacks, namely:
 Pfeil (12 – 22 September 1942) 
 Blitz (22 – 26 September 1942) 
 Tiger (26 – 30 September 1942) 
 Wotan (5 – 17 October 1942) 
 Delphin (23 January – 9 February 1943) 
 Rochen (9 – 20 February 1943) 
 Adler (11 – 13 April 1943) 
 Meise (13 – 27 April 1943) 
 Star (27 April – 4 May 1943) 
 Inn (11 – 15 May 1943) 
 Donau 1 (15 – 20 May 1943)

Summary of raiding history

References

Bibliography

External links

1941 ships
German Type VIIC submarines
U-boats sunk in 1943
U-boats sunk by British aircraft
Ships lost with all hands
World War II submarines of Germany
Ships built in Bremen (state)
U-boats commissioned in 1942
Maritime incidents in May 1943